William Owen (1872–1906) was an English footballer who played in the Football League for Everton and Wolverhampton Wanderers.

References

1872 births
1906 deaths
English footballers
Association football midfielders
English Football League players
Wolverhampton Wanderers F.C. players
Loughborough F.C. players
Everton F.C. players
FA Cup Final players